Dubinino is a rural locality (a selo) in Inzersky Selsoviet, Beloretsky District, Bashkortostan, Russia. The population was 45 as of 2010. There are 5 streets.

Geography 
Dubinino is located 62 km northwest of Beloretsk (the district's administrative centre) by road. Yusha is the nearest rural locality.

References 

Rural localities in Beloretsky District